The 17th Meril Prothom Alo Awards ceremony, presented by Prothom Alo took place on 8 May 2015 at the Bangabandhu International Conference Center in Dhaka, Bangladesh as a part of 2014–15 film awards season.

Facts and figures
This was the 17th award ceremony of Meril Prothom Alo Awards. The presence of the poet Rabindranath Tagore reflected everywhere in the show.
Prominent Togore exponents including Rezwana Choudhury Bannya, Chandana Mazumder, Papiya Sarwar, Lily Islam, Aditi Mohsin, Sharmin Shathi Islam, Topon Mahmud, Sadi Muhammad, Kiran Chandra Roy, Fahim Hossain Chowdhury, Bulbul Islam and Khairul Anam Shakil started off the show with the Tagore song 'Anondoloke, Mongolaloke'.
"Matiur Rahman will give a 154-page speech as it is the 154th birth anniversary of the great poet," the associate editor of Prothom Alo Anisul Hoque jokingly said while inviting the Prothom Alo editor to the podium in the beginning of the grandiose evening.
In his speech, editor Matiur Rahman said Rabindranath Tagore always felt the necessity of publishing a neutral newspaper. 'Prothom Alo', the title has been taken from a Tagore song. Anjan Chowdhury, managing director of Square Toiletries said the award ceremony is to honour those artists who work tirelessly.

This year a new award named Best newcomer (Film and TV) was introduced and model and actress Tanjin Tisha secured the award. Brihonnola and Taarkata were nominated for three awards where the first one secured two awards and the latter secured one. Mostofa Sarwar Farooki received best film director award for Pipra Bidya for the second time after Third Person Singular Number in 2009. Shakib Khan secured his sixth award for Public Choice best film actor and this was fifth in a row from 2010. This was also fourth and Hat-trick award in a row from 2012 for his wife Nusrat Imroz Tisha in Public Choice best TV actress category for Bijli. Nazmun Munira Nancy got the awards in best female singer category again and that was double Hat-trick for her since 2009.

Nominees and winners
A total of 18 awards were given at the ceremony. Following is the list of the winners.

Lifetime Achievement Award – 2015

 Fahmida Khatun

Public Choice Awards – 2014

Critics Choice Awards – 2014

Special Critics Awards – 2014

Host and Jury Board
The show was anchored by popular film and TV artistes Mosharraf Karim, Nusrat Imroz Tisha, and Shaju Khadem. The members of Jury Board for television critics were Rokeya Rafiq Baby, Zahidur Rahman Anjan, Giasuddin Selim, Syed Gaosul Alam Shaon and presided by Keramat Mawla; and the members of Jury Board for film critics were Matin Rahman, Shamim Akhtar, Gazi Rakayet, Fahmidul Haque and presided by Amjad Hossain.

Presenters and performers

Presenters

Performers

See also
Bachsas Awards
Babisas Award

References

External links

Meril-Prothom Alo Awards ceremonies
2014 film awards
2015 awards in Bangladesh
2015 in Dhaka
May 2015 events in Bangladesh